Eugène Moreau de Melen (born 6 August 1912) was a Belgian field hockey player. He competed in the men's tournament at the 1936 Summer Olympics.

References

External links
 

1912 births
Year of death missing
Belgian male field hockey players
Olympic field hockey players of Belgium
Field hockey players at the 1936 Summer Olympics